María Virginia Francesa (born 25 March 1974) is a Venezuelan former professional tennis player.

Raised in Caracas, Francesa represented the Venezuela Fed Cup team in 19 ties, debuting in 1991. She won a total of 18 rubbers, nine in singles and nine in doubles. Her last appearance in 2001 was a World Group play-off tie against Croatia.

On the professional tour she reached a career high singles ranking of 311 and won two doubles titles on the ITF Women's Circuit. She had a best doubles ranking of 380 in the world.

Francesa won a gold medal at the 1993 Central American and Caribbean Games in women's doubles (with Ninfa Marra) and a mixed doubles gold medal at the 1994 South American Games (with Jimy Szymanski). She also competed for Venezuela in two editions of the Pan American Games.

ITF finals

Singles: 1 (0–1)

Doubles: 3 (2–1)

References

External links
 
 
 

1974 births
Living people
Venezuelan female tennis players
Tennis players at the 1995 Pan American Games
Tennis players from Caracas
Competitors at the 1994 South American Games
South American Games medalists in tennis
South American Games gold medalists for Venezuela
South American Games silver medalists for Venezuela
Competitors at the 1990 Central American and Caribbean Games
Competitors at the 1993 Central American and Caribbean Games
Central American and Caribbean Games medalists in tennis
Central American and Caribbean Games gold medalists for Venezuela
Central American and Caribbean Games silver medalists for Venezuela
Central American and Caribbean Games bronze medalists for Venezuela
Tennis players at the 1991 Pan American Games
Pan American Games competitors for Venezuela
20th-century Venezuelan women
21st-century Venezuelan women